Wikstroemia australis is a shrub, of the family Thymelaeaceae.  It is endemic to Norfolk Island.

Description
The shrub is erect and broomlike and grows to at least 4.0 m tall. Its branches are black and have tough bark. Its flowers are tubular and greenish yellow. It is often found in forests, ridges, and canopy gaps.

References

australis